Mario Borghezio (born on 3 December 1947) is an Italian politician from the Northern League.

Biography 
Born on 3 December 1947 in Turin. A former member of the Jeune Europe movement founded by Jean Thiriart, he was also a member of Ordine Nuovo in the 1970s. In the mid 1980s, Borghezio was a member of the group around the Orion magazine, a meeting point of Piemontese neofascists, and he served as director of the economic supplement, Orion-Finanza. A proponent of antisemitic conspiracy theories at the time, Borghezio later went on to join the "autonomist" movement at the suggestion of Maurizio Murelli, the founder of the journal and close acquaintance of Borghezio. He has also regularly taken part in rallies and congresses of the neo-fascist New Force.

Controversy and convictions
In 1993, he was sentenced to pay a fine of the equivalent of 450 € for violence on a minor. He forcefully held and turned over to the police a 12-year-old Moroccan unregistered street seller.

In July 2005, Borghezio was found guilty of arson, for setting fire to the pallets of some migrants sleeping under a bridge in Turin during a vigilante raid. For this he was sentenced to two months and twenty days in prison, converted into a fine of €3,040.

On 17 December 2005, Borghezio was injured by some No Tav activists, who recognised him on a train from Turin to Venice. Because of the encounter, he had to undergo an operation for a fractured nasal septum. That morning, he had participated in a counter-protest against the No Tav movement in the Susa Valley.

On 11 September 2007, he was arrested by Belgian police for participating in a protest against the Islamisation of Europe.

In August 2010 he called for the European Union to have its own, centralised, X-Files where anyone would be able to access information on UFOs, even records held by the military. Borghezio argued that governments should go public with the information they hold and stop what he believes is a “systematic cover-up”. Not satisfied with a central archive, Borghezio also wants a scientific centre to research UFOs, because he feels that such study would have “major scientific and technological spin-offs”. “I think that, under the principle of transparency, the EU member states have a duty to make public and available to all scientific data on UFOs which today are partially or wholly withheld”.

In May 2011, Borghezio made inflammatory remarks after the arrest of Ratko Mladić, the Serbian military leader indicted for war crimes at the Hague, including the genocide of 8000 Muslim men and boys at Srebrenica. Borghezio was quoted as saying that "Mladić is a Patriot" and "The Serbs could have halted the advance of Islam into Europe, but they weren't allowed to do so."

On 9 June 2011 Borghezio was arrested by Swiss policemen after attempting to join the 2011 annual Bilderberg conference at St. Moritz (Switzerland). He was banished from the Canton of Graubünden for the duration of the meeting. The Italian embassy in Berne lodged a diplomatic protest.

On 30 July 2011 he was suspended for three months by his party for praising several of the ideas in the manifesto of Anders Behring Breivik, the man who perpetrated the 2011 Norway attacks.

In June 2013 he was expelled from the Europe of Freedom and Democracy, a eurosceptic group in the European Parliament, for making racist remarks regarding Italy's first black cabinet minister, Cécile Kyenge.

In May 2017, Borghezio was fined € 1000 by the Milan Tribunal for racist and defamatory remarks made against the then-Minister of Integration, Cécile Kyenge, during a call-in radio show. He was also ordered to pay her an indemnity of €50'000.

In August 2019, The British newspaper The Express reports that Borghezio has asked the Italian government to sell Sicily, Sardinia and Naples to foreign countries.

Quotes
In an interview published on 7 February 2006 on Corriere Della Sera, Borghezio said: "When I'm on stage at a political rally, I become a different person. I say whatever comes out of my gut. It's exciting. No, it's more than exciting: it's like having an orgasm".

"Gaddafi was a great leader, a true revolutionary who should not be confused with the new Libyan leadership swept into power by NATO's bayonets and by oil multinationals", Reaction to the death of Muammar Gaddafi.

In October 2012 Borghezio cosponsored with fellow MEP Lorenzo Fontana a motion for a declaration by the EU Parliament calling upon Pope Benedict XVI to carry out the Consecration of Russia to the Immaculate Heart of Mary.

Notes

External links
 
 

1947 births
Living people
Politicians from Turin
Deputies of Legislature XI of Italy
Deputies of Legislature XII of Italy
Deputies of Legislature XIII of Italy
Lega Nord MEPs
MEPs for Italy 1999–2004
MEPs for Italy 2004–2009
MEPs for Italy 2009–2014
MEPs for Italy 2014–2019
Arsonists
Italian politicians convicted of crimes
Italian neo-fascists
Turin communal councillors